Katie Sushila Ratna Ghose (born July 1970) is a British charity chief executive and campaigner. In September 2019 she was appointed chief executive of KIDS, a national charity for disabled children and young people.

She was previously Chief Executive of the Women's Aid Federation of England and the Electoral Reform Society.

Personal life and education
Ghose was born in Shoreham by Sea, Sussex, to an Indian father and English mother. She went to Boundstone Community College in Lancing, Sussex and Brighton, Hove & Sussex Sixth Form College. Ghose read Law at Somerville College, Oxford and during her time at Oxford, she was editor of the student newspaper Cherwell. She then studied for a Masters in Political Science at the University of California, Riverside.

Career

In the early part of her career Ghose worked in politics, law and charities. She worked as a parliamentary researcher and senior caseworker for a Labour MP Greville Janner (1992-1994) and was then Parliamentary Officer for the National Association of Citizens Advice Bureaux (1994–1995). Ghose qualified and practised as a barrister (1997–1999), specialising in immigration, family and Human Rights law. Following her two-year law career she wrote Beyond the Courtroom: a lawyer's guide to campaigning, which was published by the Legal Action Group in 2005.

On her return to the charity sector Ghose worked for the Child Accident Prevention Trust (1999–2000) and for Age Concern (2000–2005) as their National Campaigns and Parliamentary Affairs Manager, leading campaigns to protect older workers from discrimination and to oppose unfair hospital charges.

In 2005 she was appointed Director of the British Institute of Human Rights, providing charities, hospitals and care homes with practical support and training about human rights in England.

She joined the Electoral Reform Society as Chief Executive in 2010, and was a regular media commentator on elections and voter disengagement. Ghose is currently an independent council member of the University of Sussex and a trustee of St George's House, Windsor Castle. She was a board member of the US democracy group Fair Vote (2010–2017) and a trustee and Company Secretary of Stonewall (2005–2011) and was chair of two charities, Asylum Aid (1997–1999) and Bail for Immigration Detainees (2002–2004).  She also served as a Commissioner on the Independent Asylum Commission from 2006–08.

Politics

Ghose served as CEO of Women’s Aid from 2017–19. She left by mutual agreement after video emerged of her online thanking UKIP and particularly the party's then-MP Douglas Carswell for their support for electoral reform .

After serving as a parliamentary aide to Labour MP Greville Janner Ghose sought selection as a Labour Party Parliamentary candidate in a number of constituencies prior to the 2015 general election.  Her applications to represent constituencies as diverse as Grimsby, Stoke-on-Trent North, Brighton Kemptown and York were all unsuccessful.

2011 AV referendum

Ghose became Chief Executive of the Electoral Reform Society in the autumn of 2010, during which she worked for six months as Chair of the unsuccessful 'Yes! to Fairer Votes' campaign.

See also

Electoral Reform Society

References

External links
Beyond the Courtroom: a lawyer's guide to campaigning, Katie Ghose, 2005
Electoral Reform Society

1970 births
Date of birth missing (living people)
Living people
People from Brighton
Alumni of Somerville College, Oxford
University of California, Riverside alumni
Labour Party (UK) people
Electoral reform in the United Kingdom
British women lawyers
20th-century British lawyers
21st-century British lawyers
20th-century women lawyers
21st-century women lawyers